Live in Oklahoma 1976 is a live album by the American Funk band Bootsy's Rubber Band. The album was released in 2001 and represents a collaborative effort between the Funk To The Max label, based in the Netherlands, and Bootzilla Records in the U.S.. The performance was recorded while Bootsy's Rubber Band was the support act (along with Sly and the Family Stone) for headliners Parliament-Funkadelic.

Tracks

Intro 0:50
Psychoticbumpschool 9:52
Another Point Of View 4:28
I'd Rather Be With You 10:06
The Funk Jam 7:38
Vanish In Our Sleep 4:43
Stretchin' Out In Bootsy's Rubber Band 10:30

Personnel

Bootsy Collins – Bass
Phelps Collins – Lead and Rhythm Guitar
Frankie Kash Waddy – Drums
Joel Johnson – Keyboards
Fred Wesley, Maceo Parker, Rick Gardner, Richard Griffith – Horns
Gary Cooper, Robert Johnson – Front ground vocals

References 

Bootsy Collins albums
2001 live albums